The 9M113 Konkurs (NATO reporting name AT-5 Spandrel) is a Soviet SACLOS wire-guided anti-tank missile.

A development of the 9K111 Fagot with greater firepower, the 9M113 Konkurs can use the same launchers and is very similar visually, distinguishable only by a slight bulge towards the end of the Konkurs' missile tube.

Development
The 9M113 Konkurs was developed by the Tula Machinery Design Bureau (Tula KBP). Development began with the aim of producing the next generation of SACLOS anti-tank missiles, for use in both the man-portable role and the tank destroyer role. The 9M113 Konkurs was developed alongside the 9M111; the missiles use similar technology, differing only in size.

The original 9M113 with a single-charge warhead can penetrate 600 mm of rolled homogeneous armor (RHA).

The missile entered service in 1974. Iran bought a license for the Konkurs in 1991 and began producing a copy, the Tosan (not to be confused with the Toophan), sometime around 2000.

In 1992, the price of a 9M113 missile was $13,000 United States dollars and the price of a 9P135M launcher was $135,000.

Design

The missile is designed to be fired from tracked/wheeled vehicles, although it can also be fired from the later models of 9M111 launchers. It is an integral part of the BMP-2, BMD-2 and BRDM-2 vehicles. The missile is stored and carried in a fiberglass container/launch tube.

The system uses a gas generator to push the missile out of the launch tube. The gas also exits from the rear of the launch tube in a similar manner to a recoilless rifle. The missile leaves the launch tube at 80 meters per second, and is quickly accelerated to 200 meters per second by its solid fuel motor. This initial high speed reduces the missile's deadzone, since it can be launched directly at the target, rather than in an upward arc. In flight, the missile spins at between five and seven revolutions per second.

The launcher tracks the position of an incandescent infrared bulb on the back of the missile relative to the target and transmits appropriate commands to the missile via a thin wire that trails behind the missile. The system has an alarm that activates when it detects jamming from a system like Shtora. The operator can then take manual control, reducing the missile to MCLOS. The SACLOS guidance system has many benefits over MCLOS. The system's accuracy is quoted in some sources as 90%, though its performance is probably comparable to the BGM-71 TOW or later SACLOS versions of the 9K11 Malyutka.

Models

 9M113 Konkurs (NATO: AT-5 Spandrel, AT-5A Spandrel A)
 9M113M Konkurs-M (NATO: AT-5B Spandrel B) Tandem warhead – with extended explosive probe. The warhead penetration is 750–800 mm vs RHA. Adopted in 1991. Missile 9M113M 1990. Tandem (800 mm (behind a layer of ERA)). 4,000 m (3500 m night (passive)).
  Towsan-1, Tosan,  Towsan, or  M113: Iranian licensed 9M113M Konkurs-M (AT-5B Spandrel B) copy. Introduced in early 2000. Unclear if still in production. Used primarily by paratroopers and armored vehicles.
  9N131M1 – Warhead, upgraded version.
  9N131M2-1 – Warhead, the newest upgraded version.

Operators

Current operators
 
 
 
  The launcher has been locally produced and upgraded. Procured the upgraded 9M113M [AT-5 Spandrel] ATGMs and delivered them to the troops.
 : Known to be produced by Vazov Engineering Plant.
 
  – not confirmed
 
  Egypt Mostly purchased in 1990s and captured from ISIS members
 
 
 
 
  – mounted on BVP-2 infantry fighting vehicles operated by the marine corps
  – 15,000 Konkurs-M, ordered in 2008 for Rs 1,380-crore. Another 10,000 Konkurs-M ordered for US$250 million in 2012. A new contract was signed in 2019 for USD 110 mln and another large contract was signed in early 2022 for USD 418,6 mln. Used on BMP-2 Sarath
  – produced domestically as Tosan-1
 
  (reported)
 
 
 
 
  – used on BRDM-2
 
 
 
  – Used on  Viper infantry fighting vehicle
 
 
  – about 300 Konkurs-M complexes delivered annually in the last years (2014)

Former operators
  – produced under license, passed on to Germany, and later phased out of service.
  – produced under license, passed on to successor state Slovakia.
  – known as PstOhj 82M, fired from 9P135M-1 launchers (withdrawn from service)
  – only used on 9P148, withdrawn from service and sold/scrapped
 
  – Passed on to successor states.

Non-State operators
  Hamas – Known to be used against Israeli armored vehicles.
  – Tosan version.
 
  Kurdistan Workers' Party
  People's Defense Units (YPG)

See also
 List of Russian weaponry

References

Sources
 Hull, A.W., Markov, D.R., Zaloga, S.J. (1999). Soviet/Russian Armor and Artillery Design Practices 1945 to Present. Darlington Productions. .

External links

 ATGM launcher vehicle "KONKURS" (BRDM-2) – Walk around photos
 AT-5 SPANDREL Anti-Tank Guided Missile
 PTRK Konkurs 

Anti-tank guided missiles of the Cold War
Anti-tank guided missiles of the Soviet Union
Anti-tank guided missiles of Russia
KBP Instrument Design Bureau products
Military equipment introduced in the 1970s